David Everett Odom (June 5, 1918 – November 19, 1987) was a professional baseball pitcher. He played part of the 1943 season in Major League Baseball (MLB) for the Boston Braves.

Odom began playing professional baseball in 1936 at age 18 for the Class D Jamestown Jimmies of the Northern League. He completed his baseball career with the Class C Greensboro Patriots of the Carolina League 10 years later.

References

External links

Major League Baseball pitchers
Boston Braves players
Mitchell Kernels players
Jamestown Jimmies players
Albuquerque Cardinals players
Bellingham Chinooks players
Bassett Furnituremakers players
Shelby Nationals players
Cooleemee Cools players
Winston-Salem Twins players
Beaumont Exporters players
Mayodan Millers players
South Boston Wrappers players
Sanford Spinners players
Indianapolis Indians players
Hartford Laurels players
Nashville Vols players
Greensboro Patriots players
Wilmington Pirates players
Angier-Fuquay Springs Bulls players
Baseball players from California
1918 births
1987 deaths